Babelomurex yumimarumai is a species of sea snail, a marine gastropod mollusc in the family Muricidae, the murex snails or rock snails.

Description

Distribution

References

External links
 Kilburn R.N., Marais J.P. & Marais A.P. (2010) Coralliophilinae. pp. 272–292, in: Marais A.P. & Seccombe A.D. (eds), Identification guide to the seashells of South Africa. Volume 1. Groenkloof: Centre for Molluscan Studies. 376 pp.

yumimarumai
Gastropods described in 1985